Ashutosh Das (born 17 October 1997) is an Indian cricketer. He made his Twenty20 debut for Odisha in the 2018–19 Syed Mushtaq Ali Trophy on 2 March 2019.

References

External links
 

1997 births
Living people
People from Cuttack
Indian cricketers
Odisha cricketers
Cricketers from Odisha